The Alsace-Lorraine A 3 was a class of German 2-4-0 express passenger locomotives. In 1906 the Imperial Railways in Alsace-Lorraine (Reichseisenbahnen in Elsaß-Lothringen) reclassified them as P 2.

History 
After the Franco-Prussian War (1870–1871), the territory of Alsace and Lorraine was transferred from France to the newly formed German Empire. With the acquisition, came the route network in Alsace-Lorraine. However, the previous operator, the French Chemins de fer de l'Est had moved all its rolling stock west. The new owners had to procure a fleet of locomotives, carriages and wagons quickly.

The Reichseisenbahnen bought two more directly from the AFV being that railway's second 39 and 40. The Reichseisenbahnen gave the eight locomotives the numbers 18 to 25 and the names of southern and central German rivers. The locomotives were used in passenger train traffic. Only two locomotives were renumbered in 1906, but they were retired by 1907.

Design 
The locomotives were of a common Austrian design at the time. The machines had an outer frame and a very deep three-section boiler. The steam dome was on the foremost boiler section directly behind the chimney. The firebox was behind the rear axle.

Saturated steam was delivered to two outside cylinders; the main rod was connected to the first drive axle, along with the external Allan valve gear. The drive axles were connected with a Hall crank.

The suspension is provided by leaf spring assemblies attached to the axle bearings. The springs of the coupling axles were connected by means of compensating levers.

The three-axle tender with a spindle brake was also of Austrian design.

Fleet list

References 

 

2-4-0 locomotives
1B n2 locomotives
A03
Wiener Neustädter locomotives
Railway locomotives introduced in 1870